Zonacalda is the sixth album of the Italian composer Pierluigi Castellano.

The texts, chosen and adapted by Francesco Antinucci, are of John Keats, Johann Wolfgang von Goethe and Lucretius.

Track listing
Recitativo I – 3:42 –
Ah Happy – 8:16 –
Recitativo II – 6:02 –
Have Nun Ach – 8:40 –
Recitativo III – 6:05 –
Sic Alid  – 12:19 –
Appendix I  – 7:00 –
Appendix II  – 3:22 –
Appendix III – 7:03 –

Personnel

 Pierluigi Castellano – synthesizer, sampler, conducting
 Roberto Abbondanza – vocals
 Alvin Curran – piano, shofar
 Paolo Fresu – trumpet
 Diego Conti – violin
 Luca Venitucci – electronic keyboard
 Fabrizio Spera – percussion

References

External links 

2002 albums